Mašan Vrbica (born June 14, 1994) is a Montenegrin professional basketball player for Spars of the Championship of Bosnia and Herzegovina and the Second ABA League

Professional career
He made his professional debut with Lovćen during the 2011–12 season. In the summer of 2014, he signed a three-year contract with Mega Vizura. On December 17, 2014, he was loaned to Teodo Tivat for the rest of the season.

References

External links
 Mašan Vrbica at aba-liga.com
 Mašan Vrbica at beobasket.net

1994 births
Living people
ABA League players
KK Gorica players
KK Lovćen players
KK Mega Basket players
OKK Spars players
KK Teodo Tivat players
Montenegrin expatriate basketball people in Croatia
Montenegrin expatriate basketball people in Serbia
Montenegrin men's basketball players
Point guards